The Oppo Neo 7 is the last phone in the Oppo Neo Series, before the series became known under different aliases, such as the Oppo A Series. The phone was available in two configurations: a 3G and a 4G model. Besides network connectivity differences, these models also had different chipsets. Oppo says the reflective back on the phone, which is made by a "special laminating process" is inspired by Chinese bronze mirrors. The phone is aimed at people who value the looks of a phone over the raw specs, since the price (₹9990) is higher than other phones with similar specs.

This phone was released later as Oppo A33 in November 2015 but with 146g of weight, Snapdragon 410 chipset, 2GB of RAM and a less 2400 mAh battery.

References 

Neo 7
Mobile phones introduced in 2015
Android (operating system) devices
Discontinued smartphones